Roker is a seaside resort in North East England.

Roker may also refer to:

People
 Al Roker (born 1954), American meteorologist for NBC's Today show
 J. Roker (1825–1830), English cricketer for Surrey
 Mickey Roker (1932–2017), American jazz drummer
 Raymond Roker (born 1968), Bahamian artist and magazine founder
 Ron Roker (born 1941), English singer and songwriter
 Roxie Roker (1929–1995), American actress
 Samuel Roker (born 1953), Haitian painter
 Wally Roker (1937–2015), American singer and music executive

Other uses
 Roker, Sunderland, England venues:
 Roker Park, former football stadium
 Roker Park (park), municipal space 
 Roker, marine animal A.K.A. Thornback ray